= Polishing hologram =

A polishing hologram is a visible pattern of damage to a polished surface. It is caused by small scratches to the surface, which result in light being refracted, creating a pattern which appears to float deep beneath the surface.
